Bombshell (Amy Allen) is a superheroine appearing in American comic books published by DC Comics. She first appeared in Teen Titans vol. 3, #38, and was created by Geoff Johns and Tony Daniel.

Fictional character biography
First mentioned in Teen Titans vol. 3, #38, she was a member of the Teen Titans during the one-year gap after Infinite Crisis. She has similar powers to Captain Atom as she underwent the same alien metal skin experiment that Nathaniel Adam did. Prior to this, she was recruited into a rogue military black ops unit when she was arrested for assault and battery and faced jail time. This rogue group made a habit of accepting dubious freelance contracts in addition to their own projects. Using the same extraterrestrial metal that comprises Captain Atom's skin, the group grafted the metal onto her human skin.

In #40, Bombshell is revealed to be a traitor to the Titans, as she threatens to kill Raven and attacks several members of the team to get a disc that contains the essence of the deceased Titan Jericho, but is stopped by Ravager. At the end of issue #41, the Titans beat her by shattering her metal skin. Since it is this metal coating that provides her powers, she temporarily lost her abilities.

In #43, Cyborg and Miss Martian visit a depowered Bombshell in jail. After refusing to tell them who she worked for, Miss Martian proceeds to probe her mind. In doing so, she discovers the existence of Titans East and that Bombshell is a member. Before any additional information is discovered, Batgirl and Risk break into the cell—but not to save their former teammate. Instead, Batgirl slices Bombshell's throat with a batarang.

In #63, it is revealed that Bombshell is alive. It is also revealed that she was convinced by her father to take part in the procedure instead of serving a prison sentence for assault. When Project: Quantum learns of her survival, they attempt to have her killed. Bombshell learns that her father is the head of the project and sets out to kill him. In #64, Amy's father reveals that her joining the Titans East, and her current predicament, is due to a rogue factor within Project: Quantum. At his urging, Bombshell agrees to be sheltered by the Titans for the time being. In #65, the one behind the attempts on Amy's life is none other than her own mother, the new head of Project Quantum.

Furthermore, in Final Crisis #3 she is one of the heroes covered by Article X, the mandatory draft introduced by Franklin Delano Roosevelt and the Justice Society to reunite under a single army every non-hostile metahuman or mystery man.

In Teen Titans #71, Ravager's return to the team causes friction between her and Bombshell, as Bombshell had previously tried to frame Ravager as a traitor. The two have an altercation where Ravager forces Bombshell to admit her loyalty to the team. Satisfied with Bombshell's statement, Ravager leaves the team.

In Teen Titans #84, Bombshell and her rival, Aquagirl, are swallowed by a demonic sea monster during a mission to rescue Raven from an extradimensional being called Wyld. In issue #88, it is learned that after their rescue, both Bombshell and Aquagirl were asked to leave the team by Wonder Girl, who had come to believe that it was hazardous to have "inexperienced" heroes as a part of the Teen Titans.

Following her dismissal from the Teen Titans, Bombshell appears in Batgirl #23 as one of the young heroines who helps Batgirl in her battle against the Reapers. Alongside Aquagirl and a host of other former Titans, Bombshell later returns in Teen Titans #99 to aid the Titans during their battle with Superboy-Prime.

Powers and abilities
Bombshell has Dilustel (quantum metal) skin like Major Force and Captain Atom, which was cut from the body of an alien lifeform known as the Silver Shield after being captured by Project Atom. This skin makes her nearly invulnerable and grants her a measure of superhuman strength (enough to throw a car with ease and hurt Wonder Girl and other moderately powered super beings with a punch). She can fly and fire blasts of energy. Bombshell can generate energy waves capable of scrambling the minds of others, and can control electromagnetically powered technology, like the electronic parts of Cyborg. 

Bombshell's origin is different from Captain Atom's and Major Force's in that she was not exposed to a nuclear explosion in the course of acquiring her Dilustel coating; she was merely covered with the alien material. Thus, there is no risk of a radiation hazard if her quantum metal skin is breached: in fact, damaging the metal coating beyond a certain point temporarily negates her powers.

Teen Titans #63 reveals that the metal had managed to bond to her body and she can bring forth a new coating whenever she wants to, with all the powers of the original.

References

External links 
 Bombshell profile at Titans Tower

Comics characters introduced in 2006
Female characters in comics
Fictional mercenaries in comics
Fictional characters with superhuman durability or invulnerability
Fictional special forces personnel
DC Comics characters with superhuman strength
DC Comics female superheroes
DC Comics metahumans
Characters created by Geoff Johns
Characters created by Tony S. Daniel